Nefertari or Nefertari Meritmut was a Queen of Egypt and the wife of Ramesses II. 

Nefertari may also refer to:
 Nefertari (18th dynasty), a wife of Thutmose IV
 Ahmose-Nefertari, a Queen of Egypt and a daughter of Seqenenre Tao II and Ahhotep I
 Nefertari, a daughter of Thutmose III
 Nefertari, daughter of vizier Ptahmose
 Nefertari, a child of Ramesses II
 Nefertari, wife of Prince Amun-her-khepeshef; possibly identical with the daughter of Ramesses II (19th dynasty)

Not to be confused with Nefertiti c. 1370 – c. 1330 BC, an Egyptian queen and the chief consort of Akhenaten

Ancient Egyptian given names